Stampers Creek is an unincorporated community in Paoli Township, Orange County, in the U.S. state of Indiana.

History
A post office was established at Stampers Creek in 1855, and remained in operation until it was discontinued in 1905.

Geography

References

Unincorporated communities in Orange County, Indiana
Unincorporated communities in Indiana